Radical 49 or radical oneself meaning "oneself" is one of the 31 Kangxi radicals (214 radicals total) composed of three strokes.

In the Kangxi Dictionary, there are 20 characters (out of 49,030) to be found under this radical.

 is also the 52nd indexing component in the Table of Indexing Chinese Character Components predominantly adopted by Simplified Chinese dictionaries published in mainland China.

In Chinese astrology, 巳 represents the sixth Earthly Branch and corresponds to the Snake in the Chinese zodiac. In the ancient Chinese cyclic character numeral system tiāngān, 己 represents the sixth Celestial stem.

Evolution

Derived characters

Literature

External links

Unihan Database - U+5DF1

049
052